Hans Jørgen Toming (né Esbensen; 9 June 1933 – 15 November 2002) was a Danish-born Norwegian visual artist and book designer.

Personal life
He was born in Esbjerg to Aage and Rigmor Esbensen, and grew up in Odense. In 1956 he settled in Norway and married photographer Beth Andersen, and they created/adopted the artist name Toming around 1958.

Career
Toming worked as freelancer most of his life. From 1962 he started working for the Norwegian book club . His first book, the poetry collection Fasetter, was awarded a prize for "Most beautiful book of the year". He continued collaborating with Den norske Bokklubben until 1980. Over the years he designed about 1,500 book editions. He was awarded Norsk Designpris in 1963, Amandusprisen in 1964, and Den norske billedbokprisen in 1968. He died in Oslo in 2002.

References

1933 births
2002 deaths
People from Esbjerg
Danish emigrants to Norway
Danish artists
Danish designers
Norwegian artists
Norwegian male artists
Norwegian designers